Stephen David "Steve" Train (born 23 February 1962) is a British sprint canoer and marathon canoeist who competed from the mid-1980s to the early 2000s (decade). He won six medals at the ICF Canoe Sprint World Championships with two silvers (C-2 10000 m: 1985, 1995), and four bronzes (C-2 1000 m: 1997, C-2 10000 m: 1987, 1989, 1991).

Between 1984 and 2000, Train competed in five Summer Olympics, earning his best finish of sixth twice (C-1 1000 m in 1984 and C-2 1000 m in 1996).

Train has also won three ICF Canoe Marathon World Championships, in 1988, 1996 and 1998, competing in C-2 with his brother Andrew Train.

References

External links
 
 

1962 births
Living people
English male canoeists
British male canoeists
ICF Canoe Sprint World Championships medalists in Canadian
Medalists at the ICF Canoe Marathon World Championships
Olympic canoeists of Great Britain
Canoeists at the 1984 Summer Olympics
Canoeists at the 1988 Summer Olympics
Canoeists at the 1992 Summer Olympics
Canoeists at the 1996 Summer Olympics
Canoeists at the 2000 Summer Olympics
Sportspeople from Sunderland